Ana al-Madi  (I'm the Past) is a classic 1951 Egyptian crime film. The film was written and directed by Ezzel Dine Zulficar. It starred Imad Hamdi, Zaki Rostom, Farid Shawqi, and Faten Hamama.

Plot 
Hamed is released from prison after serving 20 years for a crime he did not commit. The crime was the murder of his close friend, Kamel. Kamel's murder was the result of an affair that his wife, Elham, was having with another man, Fareed, who was the murderer. Elham covered up for her lover's murder and Hamed was falsely jailed for the murder.

Hamed wants to take his revenge for what Elham has done to his life. He looks for the couple, but he discovers that they have died. The only way to get his revenge would be from their daughter. He starts a relationship with her and marries her. After their marriage, Hamed starts bedeviling and harassing her. He treats her as a crazy woman and an object. One day, she gets pregnant. Hamed's conscience puts a stop to his evil behavior and the emotions of becoming a father overcome him.

References 
 Film summary, Faten Hamama's official site. Retrieved on January 18, 2007.
 Movie details, Aramovies.com. Retrieved on January 18, 2007.
 Summary, Adab wa Fan. Retrieved on January 18, 2007.

External links
 

1952 films
1950s Arabic-language films
1952 crime films
Egyptian crime films
Egyptian black-and-white films
Films directed by Ezz El-Dine Zulficar